Mimagoniates microlepis, also known as the blue tetra (a common name shared with Tyttocharax madeirae, Knodus borki, and possibly other Characidae, as well), the croaking tetra (a name also applied to Mimagoniates inequalis and Mimagoniates lateralis), the small-scaled tetra, is a species of tetra in the genus Mimagoniates. First identified by Franz Steindachner in 1876 and named Coelurichthys microlepis, it has also been identified as Coelurichthys iporangae (Miranda-Ribeiro, 1908), Coelurichthys lateralis, and Mimagoniates iporangae (McAllister, 1990) besides its current taxonomic classification. There is evidence of a variety called M. microlepis 'Joinville' which might be synonymous with Paragoniates microlepis.

Habitat
This freshwater fish is found in clear coastal rivers and streams in eastern Brazil, ranging from southern Bahia to northern Rio Grande do Sul. It prefers temperatures of 18–23 °C (64–73 °F).

Anatomy
Genetic diversity with the species is evidenced by its variable phenotype. For example, in this wild-caught specimen, a brownish-black stripe runs along either side of its body from head to tail. Directly above this and touching it is stripe of similar size but of a lighter brown-beige color. It has a sort of blueish-purplish sheen all over. Except for this sheen, their two stripes, and their internal organs, it is mostly transparent similar to the so-called "X-ray tetra", Pristella maxillaris. By comparison, this aquarium-bred specimen is mostly opaque and has much less prominent markings and this specimen caught near Ubatuba has an appearance somewhat between those of the two previously described. According to a 2008 report, "phylogeographic studies based on molecular data indicate significant differences between the isolated populations of M. microlepis."

Males have a modified breathing organ with which they make sound during courtship. They also have a modified caudal gland used to release pheromones, a characteristic they share with all members of the Glandulocaudinae subfamily.

Sound

Like related species sometimes referred to as "croaking tetras" or "chirping tetras", M. microlepis has a supplementary breathing organ located above its gills which makes a faint chirping sound when it comes to the surface to gulp air.  This noise also plays a role in courtship, as the male chases and hovers near the female while taking gulps of air and expelling it to make a rhythmic sound. Croaking behavior may have evolved from a behavior called "nipping surface", a feeding behavior that occurs when the fish is searching for food; the fish often will gulp air when doing this. This behavior has no useful respiratory function.

Cultivation
M. microlepis is cultivated by aquarists and is appropriate for inclusion in a tank with other species of nonaggressive fish. They accept frozen and dry food, but live food is especially recommended.

Breeding them is not difficult and a spawning mop (a sort of synthetic plant resembling the head of an old-fashioned mop) may be used as a substrate upon which they can lay and fertilize their eggs. The parents should then be removed so that they do not cannibalize their eggs or young. The fry emerge from their eggs in two or three days. Newborn M. microlepis may be feed firstly paramecia and rotifers. After increasing their size somewhat, brine shrimp may be offered.

References

Tetras
Characidae
Fish described in 1876
Taxa named by Franz Steindachner